Milton Holland (born Milton Olshansky; February 7, 1917 – November 4, 2005) was an American drummer, percussionist, ethnomusicologist, and writer in the Los Angeles music scene.  He pioneered the use of African, South American, and Indian percussion styles in jazz, pop and film music, traveling extensively in those regions to collect instruments and learn styles of playing them.

Early life
Holland was born Milton Olshansky in Chicago, Illinois, where he attended Theodore Roosevelt High School. His first instrument was the violin. He pursued a passion for percussion, playing in clubs and shows and on CBS Radio in Chicago. By the age of twelve, he was playing at speakeasies for the likes of Al Capone.

Career
In the early 1940s, Holland toured and recorded with The Raymond Scott Orchestra.

He studied tabla at University of California, Los Angeles and from 1963 through 1978 with tabla master Chatur Lal, Ramnad Easwaran and others.  He traveled through India extensively in the early 1960s and 1970s, then spent many years in Africa studying tribal rhythms. He was among the first to introduce the instruments to western recording.

After moving to Los Angeles in 1946, he played on countless jazz and pop albums, film and TV scores.  A sampling of the artists he worked with includes Frank Sinatra, Bing Crosby, the Beatles, the Rolling Stones, Chaka Khan, John Williams, Leonard Bernstein, Elmer Bernstein, Quincy Jones, Nat King Cole, Henry Mancini, Loggins and Messina, James Taylor, Ella Fitzgerald, Laurindo Almeida, Ry Cooder, Bonnie Raitt, Seals and Crofts, Ray Manzarek, Michael Dinner, Gordon Lightfoot, Ringo Starr, Kenny Loggins, Jim Messina, Poco, Captain Beefheart, David Blue, Rita Coolidge, Carly Simon, Cal Tjader, the Doobie Brothers, Little Feat, Maria Muldaur, Randy Newman, and Joni Mitchell. He played pandeiro, congas and triangle on Mitchell's hit Big Yellow Taxi and congas and percussion on Light My Fire with José Feliciano.

As part of the so-called "Wrecking Crew," Holland won several gold and platinum records for his contributions. He was perhaps most proud of having helped desegregate the Los Angeles Musicians Union.  Eventually, Holland became the first choice for exotic percussion among Los Angeles freelance session musicians.

In films, Holland played bongos on the soundtrack of West Side Story and timpani the soundtrack of Silent Running, to name only a tiny fraction of his output. He was one of seven illustrious percussionists, including Shelly Manne, Jack Sperling, and Larry Bunker, who contributed to the soundtrack of the John Wayne film Hatari!, playing African instruments on the soundtrack album, The Sounds of Hatari, and its title track. He played for the soundtrack of the TV miniseries Roots. He also played the musical accompaniment for Tinker Bell in the 1953 Disney cartoon film Peter Pan and for the nose tinkle in the TV series Bewitched.

Death and personal life
Holland died in Los Angeles at the age of 88.  He was survived by his wife Mildred Holland, his sons, Richard Holland and Robert Holland, his grandchildren, Damien and Chloe, and Richard's wife Seiko.

His widow Mildred died on October 21, 2015.

Discography

As leader
Perfect Percussion: The 44 Instruments of Roy Harte & Milt Holland (World-Pacific Records, 1961)

As sideman
With Karen Alexander
 Isn't It Always Love (Asylum, 1975)
With Gregg Allman Band
 Playin' Up a Storm (Capricorn, 1977)
With Laurindo Almeida
 Ole! Bossa Nova (1962)
 Acapulco '22 (Tower, 1963)
 Brazil & Beyond (1981)
 Brazilian Soul (Concord, 1981)
With Hoyt Axton
 Life Machine (A&M, 1974)
With Burt Bacharach
 Blue Note Plays Burt Bacharach (Blue Note, 2004)
With Joan Baez
 Gracias a la Vida (A&M, 1974)
With David Batteau
 Happy in Hollywood (A&M, 1976)
With Louis Bellson
 Louis Bellson Swings Jule Styne (1960)
With Elmer Bernstein
 The Man with the Golden Arm (Decca, 1956)
With Elvin Bishop
 Rock My Soul (Epic, 1972)
With David Blue
 Stories (Asylum, 1971)
With Bonaroo
 Bonaroo (Warner Bros., 1975)
With Delaney Bramlett
 Some Things Coming (Columbia, 1972)
With Charlie Byrd
 Best Of The Concord Years (2000)
With Glen Campbell
 Southern Nights (Capitol, 1977)
With Captain Beefheart
 Safe As Milk (1967)
 Clear Spot (1972)
With Buddy Childers
 Sam Songs (1955)
With Stanley Clarke
 School Days (1976)
With Joe Cocker
 Joe Cocker! (A&M, 1969)
With Ray Conniff
 Friendly Persuasion (1965)
With Ry Cooder
 Ry Cooder (Reprise, 1970)
 Into the Purple Valley (Reprise, 1971)
 Boomer's Story (Reprise, 1972)
 Paradise and Lunch (Reprise, 1974)
 Chicken Skin Music (Reprise, 1976)
 Bop Till You Drop (Warner Bros., 1979)
With Rita Coolidge
 Fall Into Spring (A&M, 1974)
With Bing Crosby and Rosemary Clooney
 Fancy Meeting You Here (RCA Victor, 1958)
With Patti Dahlstrom
 Your Place or Mine (20th Century, 1975)
With Bobby Darin
 Bobby Darin Sings The Shadow of Your Smile (Atlantic, 1966)
With Ron Davies
 U. F. O. (A&M, 1973)
With Jackie Davis
 Hammond Goes Cha-Cha (1959)
With Buddy DeFranco
 I Hear Benny Goodman and Artie Shaw
 Wholly Cats
With Doug Dillard
 The Banjo Album (Together, 1969)
With The 5th Dimension
 Age of Aquarius (Soul City, 1969)
 Individually & Collectively (Bell, 1972)
 Living Together, Growing Together (Bell, 1973)
With The Doobie Brothers
 What Were Once Vices Are Now Habits (Warner Bros., 1974)
With Don Everly
 Don Everly (Ode, 1970)
With Percy Faith
 Black Magic Woman (CBS, 1971)
With Little Feat
 Sailin' Shoes (Warner Bros., 1972)
 Dixie Chicken (Warner Bros., 1973)
With Victor Feldman
 Secret Of The Andes (Nautilus, 1982)
With José Feliciano
 Feliciano! (RCA Victor, 1968)
 Souled (RCA Victor, 1968)
 10 to 23 (RCA Victor, 1969)
 And the Feeling's Good (RCA Victor, 1974)
With Jerry Fielding
 Jerry Fielding and his Orchestra (1953)
With Ella Fitzgerald
 Get Happy! (Verve, 1959)
 Hello Love (Verve, 1960)
With The Free Movement
 I've Found Someone of My Own (1972)
With Four Freshmen
 Voices In Latin (1958)
 The Freshman Year (1958)
With Art Garfunkel
 Angel Clare (Columbia, 1973)
With Jackie Gleason
 The Now Sound For Today's Lovers (1969)
With Graham Central Station
 Graham Central Station (1975)
With Arlo Guthrie
 Running Down the Road (Reprise, 1969)
 Arlo Guthrie (Reprise, 1974)
 Amigo (Reprise, 1976)
With Lani Hall
 Sun Down Lady (A&M, 1972)
 Sweet Bird (A&M, 1976)
With Richard Harris
 The Yard Went On Forever (Dunhill, 1968)
With Joni James
 Like Three O'Clock In The Morning (MGM, 1963)
 After Hours (MGM, 1963)
With Pete Jolly
 Seasons (A&M, 1970)
With Quincy Jones
 The Hot Rock OST (Prophesy, 1972)
 Roots (A&M, 1977)
With Barbara Keith
 Barbara Keith (Reprise, 1973)
With Stan Kenton
Retrospective
With Al Kooper
 Easy Does It (Columbia, 1971)
With Peggy Lee
 Bridge Over Troubled Water (Capitol, 1970)
With Claudia Lennear
 Phew (Warner Bros., 1973)
With Ketty Lester
 Love Letters (ERA, 1962)
With Gordon Lightfoot
 Sundown (Reprise, 1974)
 Cold on the Shoulder (Reprise, 1975)
With Kenny Loggins
 Keep the Fire (Columbia, 1979)
With Henry Mancini
 The Latin Sound Of Henry Mancini (1965)
 Mancini '67 (1966)
 Mancini Salutes Sousa (1972)
With Johnny Mandel 
 I Want to Live (United Artists, 1958)
With Herbie Mann
 The Magic Flute of Herbie Mann (1957)
 Sound of Mann (Verve, 1963)
With Mark-Almond
 To The Heart (ABC, 1976)
With Dean Martin
 Young Dino (Proper, 2006)
With Melanie
 Photograph (Atlantic, 1976)
 Seventh Wave (Neighborhoud, 1983)
With Jim Messina
 Oasis (Columbia, 1979)
With Loggins & Messina
 Sittin' In (Columbia, 1971)
 Loggins and Messina (Columbia, 1972)
 Full Sail (Columbia, 1973)
 Mother Lode (Columbia, 1974)
 So Fine (Columbia, 1975)
 Native Sons (Columbia, 1976)
With Joni Mitchell
 Ladies of the Canyon (Reprise, 1970)
 Court And Spark (Asylum, 1974)
With The Monkees
 The Birds, The Bees & the Monkees (Colgems, 1968)
 Instant Replay (Colgems, 1969)
With Howdy Moon
 Howdy Moon (A&M, 1974)
With Johnny Nash
 Celebrate Life (CBS, 1974)
With Randy Newman
 12 Songs (Reprise, 1970)
 Sail Away (Reprise, 1972)
 Good Old Boys (Reprise, 1974)
 Little Criminals (Reprise, 1977)
With Harry Nilsson
 Pandemonium Shadow Show (RCA Victor, 1967)
 Aerial Ballet (RCA Victor, 1968)
 Harry (RCA Victor, 1969)
 The Point! (RCA Victor, 1970) 
 Aerial Pandemonium Ballet (RCA Victor, 1971)
 Son of Schmilsson (RCA Victor, 1972)
With Anita O'Day
 Anita Sings the Most (Verve, 1957)
 Complete Signature & London Recordings (The Jazz Factory, 2001)
With Gabby Pahinui
 Best Of The Gabby Band (1979)
With Van Dyke Parks
 Discover America (Warner Bros., 1972)
With Linda Perhacs
 Parallelograms (Kapp, 1970)
With Oscar Peterson
 Oscar Peterson and Friends (1952)
With Ray Peterson
 Tell Laura I Love Her (1960)
With Bill Plummer
 Cosmic Brotherhood (1968)
With Poco
 Poco (Epic, 1970)
With Bonnie Raitt
 Takin' My Time (Warner Bros., 1973)
With Helen Reddy
 Helen Reddy (Capitol, 1971)
With Martha Reeves
 Martha Reeves (MCA, 1974)
With Johnny Rivers
 Road (Atlantic, 1974)
 Outside Help (Big Tree, 1977)
With Shorty Rogers
 Bossa Nova (1962)
With Rufus with Chaka Khan
 Ask Rufus (ABC, 1977)
With Pete Rugolo
 The Original Music of Thriller (1961)
With Sanford & Townsend
 Duo-Glide (Warner Bros., 1977)
With Lalo Schifrin
 Gone with the Wave (1964)
 Jazz Suite on the Mass Texts (1965) with Paul Horn
 There's a Whole Lalo Schifrin Goin' On (1968)
With Seals and Crofts
 Summer Breeze (Warner Bros., 1972)
 Get Closer (Warner Bros., 1976)
With John Sebastian
 Tarzana Kid (Reprise, 1974)
With Neil Sedaka
 Sedaka's Back (Rocket, 1974)
 Laughter in the Rain (Polydor, 1974)
 The Hungry Years (Rocket, 1975)
With Bud Shank
 Bossa Nova Jazz Samba (1962) with Clare Fischer
 Brasamba! (1963) with Clare Fischer and Joe Pass
With Ravi Shankar
 Charly: Original Soundtrack Recording (1968)
With Carly Simon
 Another Passenger (Elektra, 1976)
With Frank Sinatra
 The Capitol Years (Capitol, 1990)
With Tom Snow
 Taking It All in Stride (Capitol, 1975)
 Tom Snow (Capitol, 1976)
With Phil Spector
 Back to Mono (1958–1969) (ABKCO, 1991)
With Ringo Starr
 Ringo (Apple, 1973)
With Barbra Streisand
 Stoney End (Columbia, 1971)
With James Taylor
 Gorilla (Warner Bros., 1975)
 In the Pocket (Warner Bros., 1976)
With Bill Thomson
 Fantabulous (1957)
With Cal Tjader
 West Side Story (Fantasy, 1961)
 Cal Tjader Plays the Contemporary Music of Mexico and Brazil (Verve, 1962)
 A Jazz Tribute to Antonio Carlos Jobim (2004)
With Various Artists
 Samba do Avião (Rhino, 2005)
With Wendy Waldman
 The Main Refrain (Warner Bros., 1976)
With Jennifer Warnes
 Jennifer (Reprise, 1972)
With Nancy Wilson
 Today, Tomorrow, Forever (Capitol, 1964)
With Paul Winter
 Icarus (1972)

Soundtracks

References

External links

Verve Music Biography of Milt Holland

1917 births
2005 deaths
American session musicians
Musicians from Chicago
Musicians from Los Angeles
Deaths from Alzheimer's disease
Deaths from dementia in California
American rock percussionists
American jazz percussionists
American jazz drummers
American rock drummers
American jazz vibraphonists
Tabla players
Maracas players
Tambourine players
Conga players
Bongo players
Timbaleros
American marimbists
Timpanists
Xylophonists
Castanets players
Triangle players
Güiro players
Cimbalom players
Tubular bells players
20th-century American drummers
American male drummers
Snare drummers
Washboard players
The Wrecking Crew (music) members
Jazz musicians from Illinois
Jazz musicians from California
20th-century American male musicians
American male jazz musicians